Scott Garnham (born 22 February 1985) is an English professional actor. Notable credits include Billy Elliot The Musical, Les Misérables, Made in Dagenham directed by Rupert Goold, and Pompidou by Matt Lucas for the BBC.

Early life 
Garnham was born in Malton, North Yorkshire and attended Norton Community Primary School and later Norton College. He graduated, with a master's degree, from the Royal Scottish Academy of Music and Drama, later known as the Royal Conservatoire of Scotland, in 2006.

Garnham began acting at the age of 7 attending classes at Kirkham Henry Performing Arts, based in Malton, and later performing with many local amateur theatre groups.

Early career
At the age of twelve Garnham appeared in the original cast of Stiles and Drewe's Honk! The Ugly Duckling, directed by Julia McKenzie, at the Stephen Joseph Theatre in Scarborough.

Career
Garnham made his west end debut in Eurovision Song Contest spoof Eurobeat earning positive critical responses, including a Daily Express review, declaring "a stand-out performance from Scott Garnham." Garnham played Irish entrant Ronan Corr in a hilarious performance, completed by an all-white outfit and over-zealous use of dry ice.

Following Eurobeat, Garnham landed the role of Feuilly in the West End production of Les Misérables while also understudying the roles of Enjolras and Marius, a job which won him the accolade of Understudy of the Year 2011. The performance also earned him a spot in the Les Misérables: 25th Anniversary Concert alongside Matt Lucas, Alfie Boe and Nick Jonas.

Stage work
 Nativity! The Musical, UK Tour (2019) ...Paul Maddens
 Nativity! The Musical, UK Tour (2018) ...Paul Maddens
 Billy Elliot, UK & Ireland Tour (2016/17) ...Tony
 Grand Hotel, Southwark Playhouse (2015) ...Baron Felix Von Gaigern
 Titanic, Princess of Wales Theatre, Toronto (2015) ...Edgar Beane
 Made in Dagenham, Original Cast, Adelphi Theatre (2014) ...Buddy Cortina
 I Can't Sing, Original Cast, London Palladium (2014) ...u/s Liam O'Deary
 title of show, London Premiere, Landor Theatre (2013) ...Hunter
 A Little Night Music, Yvonne Arnaud Theatre (2013) ...Mr Lindquist
 Les Misérables, Queen's Theatre (2010) ...Feuilly, u/s Enjolras & Marius
 Les Misérables: 25th Anniversary Concert, O2 Arena London (2010)
 Never Forget (musical), national tour (2009) ...Joze Reize
 Jason and the Argonauts, New Victory Theatre (2009) ...Jason
 Eurobeat - Almost Eurovision, Original Cast, Novello Theatre (2008) ...Ronan Corr
 The Rise and Fall of Little Voice, Visible Fictions (2007) ...Billy
 Honk!, Original Cast, Stephen Joseph Theatre, Scarborough, North Yorkshire (1997)

Television work
 Pompidou, BBC/ John Stanley Productions (2014)
 Les Mis at 25: Matt Lucas Dreams the Dream, BBC (2010)
 MacMusical, BBC, (2007)

References

External links
Official site
Fan site

1985 births
Living people
People from Malton, North Yorkshire
English male stage actors
Alumni of the Royal Conservatoire of Scotland